On 15 November 1577, Francis Drake began a circumnavigation which would last for 1046 days.  Before this journey, only a single expedition had completed a circumnavigation, one pioneered by Ferdinand Magellan.  On Drake's voyage, Drake was the first Englishman to navigate out of the south Atlantic Ocean and during the journey, he established the first overseas possession claims executed during the reign of Queen Elizabeth I.  At its completion, this was the longest voyage humans had made to date.

Ideas of this journey arose amidst cold war tensions between Spain and England.  During this time,  Drake formed the idea to plunder Spanish ships in the Pacific Ocean and John Dee developed a formal proposal for English circumnavigation.  After Dee submitted his proposal to Elizabeth's Privy Council, Elizabeth and Drake met at her Greenwich palace in 1577 where they finalized written details of such a voyage. In the plan, Elizabeth directed Drake to pass through the Strait of Magellan and sail north, up the coast of Chile, to 30° south latitude.  There was also the unwritten understanding, one too dangerous to record on paper, that Drake was to raid Spanish property.  He was to return home by the same route.  During the ensuing circumnavigation, an uncertain number of English sailors were lost at the cost of zero Spanish lives.

From Plymouth Sound, England, Drake navigated into the Atlantic and then the Pacific, successfully plundered Spanish ships and settlements, and eventually departed from the original plan when he continued north of 30° south latitude to what is now Guatulco, Mexico.  Due to treacherous sailing conditions in and around the Strait of Magellan and the possibility that Spaniards would be searching for him along the coast of South America, Drake abandoned the notion of returning to England by reversing his route.  Instead, he sailed northward since he believed the quickest way home could be through the hypothetical Strait of Anian. Failing to find the supposed waterway, Drake eventually circumnavigated home.  The expedition returned to England in September 1580 with one ship, Golden Hinde, which was laden with treasure. The fleet's chaplain, Francis Fletcher, and impressed pilot, Nuño da Silva, both kept logs of the journey. Drake's log was lost in the Whitehall Palace fire of 1698.

Drake's successful circumnavigation led to him being held with high regard as a sailor and explorer by his contemporaries and he became famous throughout Europe.  The value of the treasure deposited in the Tower of London, £264,000, eclipsed the revenue collected by the English Parliament each year.  Drake's feat resulted in his knighthood, attempts to the strengthen Spanish defenses, and along with the defeat of the Spanish Armada in 1588, upset the geopolitical balance of power.

1577

1578

1579

1580

Footnotes

Notes

References

Books

Journals

 

1577
1578
1579
1580
Maritime timelines
Global expeditions
Circumnavigations
History of the Royal Navy